Arthur Metrano (September 22, 1936 – September 8, 2021) was an American actor. He was noted for his role as Lt./Capt./Cmdt. Mauser in Police Academy 2: Their First Assignment and Police Academy 3: Back in Training.

Career
Metrano's film debut was as a truck driver in the 1961 Cold War thriller Rocket Attack U.S.A..  Among Metrano's TV appearances were a 1968 episode of Ironside, a 1970 episode of Bewitched, a 1976 episode of The Practice, and  The Streets of San Francisco.  In 1977, he was a regular in the cast of the short-lived CBS situation comedy Loves Me, Loves Me Not.  
He also frequently appeared on talk and variety shows in the early 1970s, especially The Tonight Show, as the Great Metrano, a "magician" who performed absurd tricks, such as making his fingers "jump" from one hand to another, while constantly humming an inane theme song – "Fine and Dandy", an early 1930s composition by Kay Swift.  
His best-known role came in 1985 as Lt./Capt./Cmdt. Mauser in Police Academy 2.  He reprised the role in its sequel Police Academy 3 a year later.

After injuring his spine in 1989, Metrano's on-screen appearances became limited during his rehabilitation.  He did, however, return to television a year later and continued making guest appearances and small roles until retiring from acting in 2001.  Between 1993 and 2001, Metrano infrequently toured a one-man show titled "Jews Don't Belong on Ladders...An Accidental Comedy", which has raised more than $75,000 for Project Support for Spinal Cord Injury, to help buy crutches, wheelchairs, and supplies for disabled people.  After a final limited set of shows in 2008, Metrano retired.

In December 2007, Metrano sued Seth MacFarlane, the producers and studio behind the television show Family Guy, asserting copyright infringement, and asking for damages of over two million dollars. The suit pertained to a "cutaway" segment from the 2005 episode Stewie Griffin: The Untold Story, where Stewie alludes to the miracles of Jesus Christ being "exaggerated a bit."  The cutaway shows Jesus performing to a group of awed onlookers while doing Metrano's act: making his fingers jump between hands while humming "Fine and Dandy". The case was settled out of court in 2010 with undisclosed terms.

Personal life
Originally from Brooklyn, New York City, Metrano lived in Aventura, Florida, with his second wife Jamie Golder. He had four children. He was born to a Turkish Jewish father and a Greek Jewish mother. Following his retirement from acting, Metrano owned a yogurt shop.

In September 1989, Metrano broke his neck and seriously injured his spinal cord after falling off a ladder while working on his house. Initially a quadriplegic, he later regained the use of his arms and legs, and was able to walk short distances with the help of crutches, although he regularly used a motorized wheelchair.

Death
Metrano died of natural causes on September 8, 2021, at his home in Aventura, Florida at the age of 84.

Filmography

 Rocket Attack U.S.A. (1961) — Truck Driver
 They Shoot Horses, Don't They? (1969) — Max
 Norma (1970) — Delivery Man
 Bonanza (1970) — Leroy Gaskell
 They Only Kill Their Masters (1972) — Malcolm
 The Heartbreak Kid (1972) — Entertainer
 Slaughter's Big Rip-Off (1973) — Mario Burtoli
 The All-American Boy (1973) — Jay David Swooze
 The Treasure of Jamaica Reef (1974) — Waiter
 Dirty O'Neil (1974) — Lassiter
 The Strongest Man in the World (1975) — TV Color Man
 Linda Lovelace for President (1975) — The Sheik 
 Kolchak: The Night Stalker (1975) — Henry "Studs" Spake
 Brinks: The Great Robbery (1976) — Julius Mareno
 Starsky & Hutch (1976, TV Series) — Amboy
 Warhead (1977) — Mario
 All in the Family (1978) — Jack
 Matilda (1978) — Gordon Baum
 Wonder Woman (1978) — Friedman
 The Incredible Hulk (1978) — Charlie
 Seven (1979) — Kinsella
 Fred and Barney Meet the Thing (1979) - Spike Hanrahan (voice)
 How to Beat the High Cost of Living (1980) — Gas Station Attendant
 Cheaper to Keep Her (1981) — Tony Turino
 Going Ape! (1981) — Joey
 History of the World, Part I (1981) — Leonardo DaVinci (The Roman Empire)
 Breathless (1983) — Birnbaum
 Teachers (1984) — Troy
  (1984) — Tiger
 The A-Team (1985) — Nick Gretsch
 Malibu Express (1985) — Matthew
 Police Academy 2: Their First Assignment (1985) — Lt. Mauser
 Police Academy 3: Back in Training (1986) — Capt. Mauser
 The Last Precinct (1986) — Mumbo Bob Volcanus
 Beverly Hills Bodysnatchers (1989) — Vic
 Real Men Don't Eat Gummy Bears (1989) — Agent 712
 Hunter (1991) — Bert Nadell
 Toys (1992) — Guard at Desk
 Murder in Mind (1997) — Judge
 How Stella Got Her Groove Back (1998) — Dr. Steinberg
 Good Advice (2001) — Homeless Man (final film role)

References
Notes

Bibliography
 Pfefferman, Naomi., The Jewish Journal, April 7, 2000 (at archive.org)

External links
 
 

1936 births
2021 deaths
20th-century American male actors
American male film actors
American male television actors
American male stage actors
American male voice actors
Male actors from New York City
People from Brooklyn
People with tetraplegia
American people of Turkish-Jewish descent
American people of Greek-Jewish descent